Telve is an island in the Baltic Sea belonging to the country of Estonia.

See also
List of islands of Estonia

Saaremaa Parish
Uninhabited islands of Estonia
Estonian islands in the Baltic